Georges Besse (25 December 1927 – 17 November 1986) was a French businessman who helped lead several large state-controlled companies. He was assassinated outside his Paris home by the armed group Action directe while he was the CEO of car manufacturer Renault.

Résumé 

 1958 - General manager of USSI Ingénierie, a uranium enrichment firm
 1964 - Assistant general manager of CIT-Alcatel
 1974 - President of Eurodif
 1978 - Chairman of COGEMA
 1982 - Director of Pechiney-Ugine-Kulmann
 1985 - Director of Renault

Renault 

Besse became the head of the public-owned Renault automaker in January 1985. He was credited with taking the money-losing company to reporting a profit only two months before he was gunned down. He was criticized because his plan to make the bloated enterprise efficient included closing plants and laying off 21,000 workers. Labor unions opposed his actions in Europe, as well as his support for Renault's investments in the United States, such as American Motors (AMC), which was also financially unsound. It invested resources into AMC for launching new Jeep vehicles, upgrading to fuel injection for updated 2.5 L and 4.0 L AMC engines, as well as a new factory in Brampton, Ontario. While some Renault executives and labor leaders perceived AMC with negative bias, Besse championed the future in the North American market just as Jeep four-wheel drives were riding an unprecedented surge in demand. Not only did Besse make Renault profitable, but AMC was also on course to profitability with growing markets and sales.

Assassination 

Besse was gunned down at about 20:25 in the evening of 17 November 1986 on the sidewalk at the front steps of 16 Boulevard Edgar Quinet, walking to his 18th-century villa at 12 Boulevard Edgar Quinet — in Paris' 14th Arrondissement, the Montparnasse district. It was witnessed by one of his daughters, who observed the street from an upstairs window while waiting for his 20:30 return.

Besse's killers approached just as he alighted from his chauffeur-driven car a short distance from his home. Witnesses said he was shot four to six times, in the head and in the chest, dying almost immediately when he fell on the pavement. Reports varied on whether the assailants escaped by car, motorcycle, or on foot.

Leaflets by the militant anarchist organization Action Directe were sent three months later. The organization claimed responsibility for the murder, stating the murder was in retaliation for his reforms of the financially stricken automaker Renault which involved laying off a large number of workers. However, the Action Directe members denied any responsibility during their trial.

Two women, Nathalie Ménigon and Joëlle Aubron, were charged with his murder in March 1987 and were sentenced to life imprisonment in 1989. Two other Action Directe members, Jean-Marc Rouillan and Georges Cipriani, were convicted as accomplices and also sentenced to life imprisonment.

Commemoration 

Renault's car assembly plant in Douai in northern France, was renamed in Besse's honour.

The Georges Besse gaseous diffusion uranium enrichment plant was operated by COGEMA (later AREVA) from 1979 to 2012 at Tricastin, then replaced by the Georges Besse II centrifuge enrichment plant.

See also 
 American Motors Corporation (AMC)
 List of assassinations

References

1927 births
1980s murders in Paris
1986 deaths
1986 murders in France
American Motors people
Assassinated French people
Autonomism
Businesspeople from Clermont-Ferrand
Chief executives in the automobile industry
Corps des mines
Deaths by firearm in France
École Polytechnique alumni
French terrorism victims
Mines Paris - PSL alumni
People murdered in Paris
Renault people
Terrorism deaths in France